A road is a route on land between two places that has been improved to allow travel by foot or some form of conveyance.

Road or Roads may also refer to:

Arts, entertainment and media

Film
 Road movie
 Road (2002 film), a Hindi movie
 The Road (2009 film), an American post-apocalyptic survival film 
 The Road (2011 film), a Filipino psychological horror crime drama 
 Road (2014 film), motorcycle racing documentary
 Road, Movie, a 2009 Indian film

Literature
 Road (play), by Jim Cartwright, 1986
 Roads (novel), by Seabury Quinn, 1948

Music

Road (American band), a 1970s American hard rock band 
Road (album), 1972, their only album
Road (Hungarian band)
Roads (album), by Chris Mann, 2012
Road (Fred Frith Trio album), 2021
"Roads" (Red Army Choir song), a Soviet WWII song
"Roads" (Lawson song), 2015
"Road" (TVXQ song), 2018
"Road", a song by Paul McCartney from the 2013 album New
"Road", a song by Nick Drake from the 1972 album Pink Moon
"Roads", a song by Blindside from the 2004 album About a Burning Fire
"Roads", a song by Ron Hynes from the 1974 Canadian promo album: "CBC Radio Canada Broadcast Recording LM 402"
"Roads", a song by Portishead from the 1994 album Dummy
"Roads", a song by various artists for the Roadrunner United project

Places
 Roads, Missouri, U.S.
 Roads, Ohio, U.S.
 The Roads, Miami-Dade County, Florida, U.S.

Other uses
 Road (hieroglyph)
 Road (sports), a "road game" or "away game"
 Reorganization Objective Army Division, or ROAD, a United States Army plan of organisation from the early 1960s
 Roadstead, or roads, a sheltered area outside a harbour where a ship can lie safe at anchor

See also
 
 
 Path (disambiguation)
 Route (disambiguation)
 Street (disambiguation)
 The Road (disambiguation)
 Railroad (disambiguation)
 Glossary of road transport terms